This is a list of South Korean football transfers for the 2012 season transfer window. Only transfers of the K-League are included.

K-League

Busan IPark

In:

Out:

Chunnam Dragons

In:

Out:

Daegu FC

In:

Out:

Daejeon Citizen

In:

Out:

Gangwon FC

In:

Out:

Gwangju FC

In:

Out:

Gyeongnam FC

In:

Out:

Incheon United

In:

Out:

Jeju United

In:

Out:

Jeonbuk Hyundai Motors

In:

Out:

Pohang Steelers

In:

Out:

Sangju Sangmu Phoenix

In:

Out:

Seongnam Ilhwa Chunma

In:

Out:

FC Seoul

In:

Out:

Suwon Bluewings

In:

Out:

Ulsan Hyundai

In:

Out:

References

South Korean
2012
Transfers